Woodgyer Peak is a peak above 2000 m in the Wallabies Nunataks, west of the Churchill Mountains in Antarctica. Named in honor of M. G. Woodgyer, a member of the 1962 Cape Hallett winter-over team, working as a technician on the geomagnetic project.

Mountains of Oates Land